Meting is a small town in Sindh province of Pakistan.

Meting may also refer to:
Measurement
Meting railway station